Yash-Kuch (Yäş Kös) is a rural locality (a village) in Chekmagushevsky District, Bashkortostan, Russia. The population was 19 as of 2010. There is 1 street.

Geography 
Yash-Kuch is located 19 km southeast of Chekmagush (the district's administrative centre) by road. Urnyak is the nearest rural locality.

References 

Rural localities in Chekmagushevsky District